The Curry Club  was founded by Pat Chapman in 1982, to further the understanding and appreciation of the cuisines of the Indian subcontinent. In 2007 it became known as Pat Chapman's Curry Club.

Overview
Based in Haslemere, Surrey, England, The Curry Club was best known for its publications, particularly its range of cookbooks, DVDs, a regular magazine and the Good Curry Guide a regularly published guidebook, which identifies the UK's top curry restaurants. In addition the Curry Club carried out cookery courses, demonstrations, trips to Indian restaurants and tours to India.

Curry Club members formed the national network of reporters, which led to the selection of restaurants in the Good Curry Guide and achievement awards to the top restaurants.

Until 2006, members paid a nominal subscription to receive a quarterly publication, the Curry Club Magazine with contributions from members and professionals, including features on curry and the curry lands. Regularly updated information was sent by email. Regular content included recipes, cooking features and tips, restaurant reviews, biographies on relevant people chefs and restaurateurs, wine pairings, travel and tourism information, and historical pieces. Its remit was to cover Asian cuisine i.e. South Asian cuisine (including Bangladeshi, Indian, Pakistani, Nepalese and Sri Lankan cuisines). It also included occasional input on other exotic and spicy cuisines. The magazine  was later replaced by the Curry Magazine.

The Club held hands-on private and group cooking tutorials at its Haslemere cooking school, and on the social side organised gourmet nights at selected restaurants and venues. Between 1983 and 2009, the Club organised sixteen gourmet trips to India and other countries, where a small group of enthusiasts engaged in sightseeing as well as sampling the food of each region.

History
Chapman founded the Curry Club as a hobby business in January 1982 at a time in which little information had been published on the subject of curry and many of the published recipes were complicated and contained hard-to-get ingredients.

References

External links
Pat Chapman's official homepage

Gastronomical societies
Curry
Indian cuisine in the United Kingdom
1982 establishments in the United Kingdom
Haslemere